Goszczanów  is a village in Sieradz County, Łódź Voivodeship, in central Poland. It is the seat of the gmina (administrative district) called Gmina Goszczanów.

The village has a population of 824. There is a parish church of Saints Martin & Stanislaus. Founded by Adam Poniatowski herbu (Coat of Arms) Szreniawa and built in 1666, in Baroque style.

References

Villages in Sieradz County